was a railway station on the Esashi Line in Kaminokuni, Hokkaido, Japan, operated by Hokkaido Railway Company (JR Hokkaido). It opened in 1957 and closed in May 2014.

Lines

Station layout
The station consisted of a single side platform serving a bidirectional single track.

Adjacent stations

History
Shinmei Station opened on 25 January 1957. With the privatization of JNR on 1 April 1987, the station came under the control of JR Hokkaido. The station closed in 2014, with the last services on the line running on 11 May.

See also
 List of railway stations in Japan

References

External links

Stations of Hokkaido Railway Company
Railway stations in Hokkaido Prefecture
Railway stations in Japan opened in 1957
Railway stations closed in 2014
2014 disestablishments in Japan